Pico Almenara is a 1796 m (5893.4 ft.) high mountain in Spain.

Geography 
The mountain is located in Albacete Province, in the southern part of the autonomous community of Castile–La Mancha. It's the highest peak of the Sierra de Alcaraz, and is visible from a large part of the province.

Access to the summit 
The summit can be accessed by hiking trails on the different faces of the mountain. From 1000 to 1600 metres above sea level they mainly go through pine woods while the last part of the hikes walk through open terrain.

See also

Baetic System

References

External links
  Route to Pico de Almenara from Riópar

Baetic System
Almenara
Geography of the Province of Albacete
Almenara